Nadja Benaissa (born 26 April 1982) is a German singer and television personality. She rose to fame in late 2000 when she auditioned for the German adaption of the reality television show Popstars and became a member of the girl group No Angels, one of the best-selling girl groups of European origin of all time. During their hiatus, Benaissa released her solo album, Schritt für Schritt (2007), which produced the single "Ich hab dich", and represented Hesse in the Bundesvision Song Contest 2006 with the song, finishing in fourth place.

No Angels reunited in 2007. Benaissa announced her departure from the group in 2010 after she was found guilty of one count of causing grievous bodily harm and two counts of attempted bodily harm and given a two-year suspended sentence. The charges stemmed from Benaissa having unprotected sex with people who were not aware of her HIV-positive status. Months later, Benaissa released Alles wird gut, her first autobiography, and relocated to Berlin where she withdrew from the public eye to pass her Abitur exams, and qualified as an event manager.

In 2019, Benaissa joined the a cappella group Medlz, with whom she recorded and released two studio albums. In 2021, she left the band to re-join No Angels for their 20th anniversary celebrations.

Early life 
Born in Frankfurt, Benaissa is the second child born to a Moroccan father, Muhamed Benaissa, and a mother of mixed Serbian and German ethnicity, Sabina. Raised alongside her three years older brother Amin, she spent much of her childhood in Langen, where her parents worked in the catering business, and she attended the Geschwister-Scholl-Schule.

At the age of nine, Benaissa began playing instruments, learning the piano and the flute. Her early musical interest grew after having auditioned and won a role in the school stage musical Tabaluga during her first year at the Dreieich-Schule-Langen. In her early teenage years, she began writing songs, and at the age of 13 Benaissa started performing in several cover bands within the Frankfurt area, eventually winning the second place at Jugend musiziert, a supraregional music contest for youths.

On 25 October 1999, at the age of 17, Benaissa gave birth to her daughter Leila Jamila, an event which she describes as "the proudest moment of [her] life". Although Benaissa and her boyfriend ended their relationship, Benaissa began attending evening classes in pursuit of her Realschulabschluss school certificate.

Career

2000–2003: Breakthrough with No Angels 

In mid-2000, Benaissa, along with thousands of other women, applied for the debut installment of the German reality television program Popstars, a talent show looking to put together an all-female band. Sailing through the selection process, judges Simone Angel, Rainer Moslener and Mario M. Mendryzcki were generally impressed by her performances, which earned her a position in the top ten finalists despite her struggle with dancing choreography. During a special episode in November 2000, jury member Angel eventually disclosed that Benaissa had been selected to become part of the final five-member girl group No Angels. Initially hesitant about signing a recording contract which would force her to leave her baby daughter with her parents, the show's producers remained persuasive and Benaissa eventually agreed on joining the band.

With the final five members of the band in place, Popstars continued tracking the development and struggles of the group who left homes to move into a shared flat near Munich, Bavaria. However, it took another four months until the band released their debut single "Daylight in Your Eyes", which would subsequently appear on the band's debut album Elle'ments (2001). Both the single and the album became an unexpected but record-breaking success, when both instantly entered the top position on the Austrian, German and Swiss Media Control singles, albums and airplay charts, giving No Angels one of the most successful debuts in years. Suffering from the separation from her daughter, Benaissa burned out within months, a subject on which she later commented:

Nevertheless, Benaissa decided to remain with the band, and in the following years No Angels released another two number-one studio albums, Now... Us! and Pure, a live album and a successful swing album branded When the Angels Swing, totalling twelve singles altogether – including four-number one singles. Eventually selling more than five million singles and albums worldwide, No Angels became the best-selling German girl band to date and the most successful girl group of continental Europe between the years of 2001 and 2003. On 5 September 2003, the four remaining members of the band (Jessica Wahls had left the band following the birth of her first child in February 2003) announced that they would no longer be performing together after three years of continual touring and increasing cases of illness. The release of The Best of No Angels in November of the same year marked the end of the band, with each member going their separate ways in early 2004.

2005–2006: Launching a solo career 
While her former bandmates pursued solo careers in music and television, Benaissa, who had suffered from intense sleep deprivation, decided to focus on her recovered motherhood the following months. In fall 2004, however, she signed a solo contract with the urban music division of Universal Music and started work on her debut album. Encouraged to perform soul and R&B music with lyrics in German language after a 2001 participation in the Sisters Keepers project's single "Liebe & Verstand", Benaissa decided to focus on writing songs with German lyrics only. As a result, she released her first solo single, "Es ist Liebe", produced by Tino Oac, in September 2005. The Motown-inspired ballad received positive reception from music critics, but failed to reach the top 50 of the German Singles Chart.

In the fall of 2005 Benaissa went on tour as a supporting act for the German leg of Simply Red – In Concert. Afterwards she prepared the release of her second single "Ich hab dich", which was chosen to represent Hesse on the 2nd Bundesvision Song Contest. Benaissa eventually finished fourth with 104 points, while the single entered at number 36 on the German Singles Chart. Two weeks later Schritt für Schritt was released, yet barely reaching the top 70. In June 2006, Benaissa participated in another non-profit-making aid project when she provided vocals for the Fury in the Slaughterhouse cover, "Won't Forget These Days", released during the 2006 FIFA World Cup.

2007–present: Reformation of the band 

Although Benaissa was preparing her second studio album for a February 2007 release, involving production by German producers Audiotreats, DJ Desue, Loomis Green, MRF Entertainment, and Monroe among others, she decided to postpone the release in favour of a reunion of No Angels in early 2007. However, as all four band members had settled on the continuation of solo projects, Benaissa entered Berlin recording studios in January 2008 to record fifteen new demo songs, including material she already penned in 2003. According to her MySpace blog, she finished the album recordings with a second session in March 2008.

In May 2010, No Angels began their five-date acoustic "An Intimate Evening With" tour in Munich, their first concert tour in eight years. Benaissa did not take part in the tour as she had called in sick a week before, prompting the remaining trio to re-arrange their set at the last minute. In September 2010, after months of speculation, the singer announced via MySpace that she had quit the band for good, leaving No Angels as a trio. In her statement, Benaissa claimed she felt that she had become bigger than the group, stating: "The scandal, the trial – they were overwhelmed by it [...] They'll be fine without me."

Also in September 2010, Benaissa released her biography Alles wird gut, written by Tinka Dippel.

Personal life 
Benaissa gave birth to a daughter in 1999.
Benaissa was diagnosed with HIV when she was 17 during a routine screening after she became pregnant. She was in a long-term relationship with Senegalese footballer of French citizenship Abdou Mbodji.

Legal problems 
On 11 April 2009, Benaissa was arrested on suspicion of having had unprotected intercourse on several occasions in 2004 and 2006 without beforehand informing her partners that she was HIV-positive, allegedly infecting one partner with HIV. She was remanded into custody, after a judge ruled there was a danger she might repeat the alleged offence, but eventually released on 21 April 2009, subject to unnamed conditions.

On 12 February 2010, she was charged with causing bodily harm, an offence carrying a sentence of six months to ten years imprisonment. On 16 August 2010, she admitted in court to having had unprotected sex without telling her partners she was HIV-positive, but denied deliberately causing any infection. Benaissa had unprotected sex with three men between 2000 and 2004. One of her partners became infected with HIV. The victim, her boyfriend, found out that Benaissa has HIV after speaking with her aunt. He later got tested and found that he had contracted the virus. On 26 August 2010, she was found guilty on one count of causing grievous bodily harm and two of attempted bodily harm and was given a two-year suspended sentence.

Discography

Studio albums

Singles

Appearances

References

External links 
 Nadja Benaissa on Myspace

1982 births
Living people
Musicians from Frankfurt
German women singers
German people of Moroccan descent
Place of birth missing (living people)
German people of Serbian descent
German soul singers
People with HIV/AIDS
Participants in the Bundesvision Song Contest
Eurovision Song Contest entrants of 2008
Eurovision Song Contest entrants for Germany
German women songwriters
Criminal transmission of HIV
No Angels members
English-language singers from Germany
Popstars winners